Myadora biconvexa is a bivalve mollusc of the family Myochamidae.

References
 Powell A. W. B., New Zealand Mollusca, William Collins Publishers Ltd, Auckland, New Zealand 1979 

Myochamidae
Bivalves of New Zealand
Bivalves described in 1927
Taxa named by Arthur William Baden Powell
Endemic fauna of New Zealand
Endemic molluscs of New Zealand